Burnaby was a federal electoral district in British Columbia, Canada,  that was represented in the House of Commons of Canada from 1979 to 1988.

This riding was created in 1976 from parts of Burnaby—Richmond—Delta, Burnaby—Seymour and New Westminster ridings

It was abolished in 1987 when it was redistributed into Burnaby—Kingsway and New Westminster—Burnaby ridings.

Members of Parliament

Election results

See also 

 List of Canadian federal electoral districts
 Past Canadian electoral districts

External links 
 Riding history from the Library of Parliament

Former federal electoral districts of British Columbia